Michael Elmgreen (born 1961; Copenhagen, Denmark) and Ingar Dragset (born 1969; Trondheim, Norway) have worked together as an artist duo since 1995. Their work explores the relationship between art, architecture and design.

Elmgreen & Dragset live and work in Berlin. They are known for art work that has wit and subversive humour, and also addresses social and cultural concerns.

Life and work
The duo met in Copenhagen in 1994, when Michael Elmgreen, who was born in the city in 1961, was writing and performing poetry, and Ingar Dragset, a Norwegian born in 1969, was studying theatre. They started collaborating in 1995 and moved to Berlin in 1997. In 2006, they bought a large 1000m2 former water-pumping station dating to 1924 in Berlin's Neukölln borough from the city and converted it into a studio. In 2008, Elmgreen moved to London, and in 2015, he moved back to Berlin.

Since 1997, the artists have presented a great number of architectural and sculptural installations in an ongoing series of works entitled 'Powerless Structures' in which they transformed the conventions of the 'white cube' gallery space, creating galleries suspended from the ceiling, sunk into the ground or turned upside down. For the Istanbul Biennial in 2001, they constructed a full-scale model of a typical Modernist Kunsthalle descending into the ground while located outdoor among ancient ruins. Their work has also been shown in the Berlin, Istanbul, Liverpool, Moscow, São Paulo, Singapore, Gwangju Biennials.

Further exhibitions include transforming the Bohen Foundation in New York into a 13th Street Subway Station in 2004; their best-known project Prada Marfa, a Prada boutique inaugurated in 2005 and sited in the middle of the Texan desert; and their exhibition The Welfare Show in 2005–2006 at Serpentine Gallery, London / The Power Plant, Toronto / Bergen Kunsthall, Norway / BAWAG Foundation, Vienna, which was critically acclaimed.

For the 53rd Venice Biennale in 2009 they curated the exhibition The Collectors in the neighbouring Danish and Nordic Pavilions (which include Norway, Sweden, and Denmark), an unprecedented merging of two international exhibition venues. For their show, they invited fellow artists Maurizio Cattelan, Tom of Finland, Han & Him, Laura Horelli, William E. Jones, Terence Koh, Klara Lidén, Jonathan Monk, Nico Muhly, Norway Says, Vibeke Slyngstad, Thora Dolven Balke, Nina Saunders, and Wolfgang Tillmans, among others.

In 2011, their sculpture Powerless Structures, Fig. 101 was chosen as the winner of the Fourth Plinth Commission to be displayed on the Fourth plinth of London's Trafalgar Square. Their bronze sculpture of a boy astride a rocking horse questions the tradition for war monuments to celebrate either victory or defeat. The work is now permanently installed outside the Arken Museum of Modern Art.

In 2013, they curated an extensive public art program in Munich entitled “A Space Called Public/Hoffentlich Öffentlich” and transformed the former textile galleries of the V & A Museum into the grand family home of fictional architect Norman Swann. Their exhibition series “Biography” took place in 2014–2015 at the Astrup Fearnley Museet, Oslo and the SMK–National Gallery of Denmark, Copenhagen. In 2015 their exhibition “Aéroport Mille Plateaux” turned the PLATEAU Samsung Museum of Art in Seoul into an airport inspired by the ideas of philosopher Gilles Deleuze.

For their solo exhibition “The Well Fair” in 2016, the duo transformed the Ullens Center for Contemporary Art in Beijing into a fictional art fair. Also in 2016, the artists installed Van Gogh’s Ear at Rockefeller Center in New York; the 9-meter (30-foot) high, empty swimming pool stands upright on its shortest side.

The artists’ first major overview in the UK, “This is How We Bite Our Tongue” was held at the Whitechapel Gallery, London, in 2018. The exhibition consisted of a large-scale site-specific installation and a survey of their sculptural works. The Whitechapel Pool, realised specifically for the show, transformed the ground-floor of the gallery into an abandoned public swimming pool fictionally dated to 1901 and related to the gentrification of the East End of London.

In 2019, Elmgreen & Dragset held their first major solo exhibition in the United States: “Sculptures” at the Nasher Sculpture Center in Dallas. Later that year, they installed a new public sculpture, “Bent Pool”, located in Miami Beach’s Pride Park, which takes the shape of a large swimming pool arching backwards to form an inverted U shape.

In Finland, the artist duo transformed the premises of EMMA – Espoo Museum of Art, into a surreal carpark environment for their exhibition “2020”, which coincided with the 25th year of Elmgreen & Dragset’s collaboration. Later that year, “The Hive” was inaugurated at the new Moynihan Hall Train Hall in Penn Station, New York. Suspended from the ceiling, “The Hive” is an upside-down, fictional cityscape illuminated by lights that will hang permanently above the 31st Street Mid-block Entrance Hall in New York City.

The following year, The Princess Estelle Cultural Foundation invited Elmgreen & Dragset to create a public sculpture for the Royal Djurgården Parks in Stockholm. “Life Rings”, a towering sculpture made up of interlocking, stainless steel life rings, now stands at 7.5 meters (25 ft) high by the waterside of the public park. In 2021, the artists also received the 14th Robert Jacobsen Prize from the Würth Foundation, in Künzelsau, Germany. To celebrate the award a solo exhibition was held at the collection’s Würth Museum 2 in Künzelsau.

More recently, Elmgreen & Dragset’s extensive exhibition “Useless Bodies?” was held at Fondazione Prada in Milan through Spring and Summer of 2022. Spanning more than 3,000 square meters, the exhibition drew focus to the status of the human body in today’s digitally saturated, post-industrial world, looking at our working conditions, living modes and the health and leisure industries. In winter 2022, the artist duo will open their forthcoming exhibition “After Dark” at By Art Matters Museum in Hangzhou, China.

Permanent installations

In 2003, Elmgreen & Dragset won the German Government's competition for a memorial in Tiergarten park in Berlin, in memory of the gay victims of the Nazi regime, which was unveiled in May 2008.

Several of their sculptures are now permanently installed for the public including their commission for the Fourth plinth, now outside the Arken Museum of Modern Art; Prada Marfa (2005), on the U.S. Highway 90 in Texas; Dilemma, a site-specific sculpture of a boy on a high diving board overlooking a fjord on the outskirts of Oslo and Han, a polished steel sculpture of a young man on a rock located in the centre of the harbor in Helsingør, Denmark.  Han was installed in 2012 and is based on Edvard Eriksen’s famous The Little Mermaid (statue). The figure sits in a similar pose, challenging conventional portrayals of masculinity.  

In 2012 Elmgreen & Dragset were also selected for London’s Fourth Plinth Commission in Trafalgar Square, where they created Powerless Structures, Fig. 101. Since then, Elmgreen & Dragset have realized: Van Gogh’s Ear, first presented by Public Art Fund at the Rockefeller Center in 2016 and since exhibited with K11 Musea in Hong Kong and Wuhan; Bent Pool (2019) in Pride Park, Miami Beach; The Hive (2020), welcoming visitors to Moynihan Train Hall in Penn Station, New York; and most recently, Life Rings at Royal Djurgården, Stockholm (2021).

Performative works
In 2007, Elmgreen & Dragset developed Drama Queens, a theatre play about Twentieth Century art history with six remote-controlled versions of iconic sculptures, for Skulptur Projekte Münster. During the 2008 Frieze Art Fair, they staged Drama Queens, this time enlivened by the voices of leading stage stars such as Jeremy Irons and Joseph Fiennes, at The Old Vic in London.

Recognition
 2000 – Hugo Boss Prize (nominated)
 2002 – Preis der Nationalgalerie, awarded by Hamburger Bahnhof
 2006 – Arken Art Prize 
 2009 – Special Mention at the Venice Biennale, for The Collectors
 2009 – Kritikerlaget/Norwegian Critics’ Association Kunstkritikerprisen/Art Critics’ Prize, awarded for The Collectors
 2012 – Eckersberg Medal 
 2012 – Carl Nielsen og Anne Marie Carl-Nielsens Legat/Carl Nielsen and Anne Marie Carl-Nielsen Grant, awarded in conjunction with an exhibition at Den Frie in Copenhagen
 2015 – Honorary doctorate, awarded by the Norwegian University of Science and Technology (NTNU)
 2020 – The B.Z.-Kulturpreis, Berlin, Germany
 2021 – Awarded the 14th Robert Jacobsen Prize of the Würth Foundation, Künzelslau, Germany
 2022 – Soho House Established Artists Award, London, UK
 2022 – Ny Carlsberg Fondet Prize, Ny Carlsberg Glypotek, Copenhagen, Denmark

Art market
Elmgreen & Dragset are represented by Pace Gallery (since 2020), Helga de Alvear, Kukje Gallery, Massimo De Carlo, Victoria Miro Gallery, Galleri Nicolai Wallner, Perrotin, and Taka Ishii Gallery. They previously worked with Johann König until 2022.

Solo exhibitions (selected)

2022
 Useless Bodies?, Fodazione Prada, Milan, Italy
 Stand By Me, Massimo de Carlo Pièce Unique, Paris, France
 After Dark, By Art Matters Museum, Hanghzhou, China (forthcoming)

2021
 The Nervous System, Pace, New York, USA
 New Tenants, Perrotin, Paris, France
 Elmgreen & Dragset, Würth Museum 2, Künzelsau, Germany
 Life Rings, Princess Estelle Foundation, Royal Djurgårten, Stockholm, Sweden
 Short Story, Copenhagen Contemporary, Copehagen, Denmark

2020
 2020, Espoo Museum of Modern Art, Espoo, Finland
 Short Story, König Gallery, Berlin, Germany
 Pool, No. 8, Gangnam, Seoul, Korea
 Elmgreen & Dragset, Pace, East Hamptons, USA

2019
"Sculptures", Nasher Sculpture Center, Dallas, Texas, USA
"It's Not What You Think", Blueproject Foundation, Barcelona, Spain
"Adaptations", Kukje Gallery, Seoul, Korea
"Overheated", Massimo De Carlo, Hong Kong

2018
"This Is How We Bite Our Tongue", Whitechapel Gallery, London, UK
"To Whom It May Concern", FIAC Hors les Murs, Place Vendôme, Paris, France
"Elmgreen & Dragset", Galerie Perrotin, Paris, France
"We Are Not Ourselves" , Cristina Guerra Contemporary Art, Lisbon, Portugal

2017
"Die Zugezogenen", Museum Haus Lange, Kunstmuseen Krefeld
"Dilemma", Ekebergparken, Oslo, Norway

2016
"The Well Fair", Ullens Center for Contemporary Art, Beijing, China
"Van Gogh's Ear", Public Art Fund, Rockefeller Center, New York, US
"Powerless Structures", Tel Aviv Museum of Art, Tel Aviv, Israel
"Elmgreen & Dragset present Galerie Perrotin at the Grand Palais", Grand Palais, Paris, France
"Changing Subjects", The FLAG Art Foundation, New York, USA

2015
"Aéroport Mille Plateaux", PLATEAU, Samsung Museum of Art, Seoul, Korea
"Self-Portraits", Victoria Miro Gallery, London, U.K.
"Stigma" , Galleria Massimo De Carlo, London, U.K.
"Stigma" , Galleria Massimo De Carlo, Milan, Italy
'"Lot", Galería Helga de Alvear, Madrid, Spain 
"Past Tomorrow", Galerie Perrotin, New York, USA

2014
"Biography", National Gallery of Denmark, Copenhagen, Denmark
“Biography”, Astrup Fearnley Museet, Oslo, Norway
"The Old World", Galerie Perrotin, Hong Kong

2013
"Tomorrow", Victoria and Albert Museum, London, UK
"A Space Called Public", Munich (curated by Elmgreen & Dragset), Germany

2012
"Harvest", Victoria Miro Gallery, London, UK
"Han", permanent public artwork installed at Kulturværftet Helsingør, Denmark
"Powerless Structures, Fig. 101", The Fourth Plinth, Trafalgar Square, London, UK

2011
"Happy Days in the Art World" , Performa 11, New York, USA / Tramway, Glasgow, Scotland
"The One & The Many", Boijmans Van Beuningen Museum, Rotterdam
"Amigos", Galería Helga de Alvear, Madrid, Spain
"The Afterlife of the Mysterious Mr. B", Galerie Emmanuel Perrotin, Paris, France
"Elmgreen & Dragset", The Thorvaldsen Museum, Copenhagen, Denmark
"It's Never Too Late to Say Sorry", daily performance, Sculpture International Rotterdam, Rotterdam, Netherlands
 "Silent wishes and broken dreams", Bayerische Staatsoper, Munich, Germany

2010
"Celebrity: The One & The Many", ZKM | Center for Art and Media, Karlsruhe, Germany

2009
"The Collectors" – The Danish and Nordic Pavilions, 53rd Venice Biennale, Venezia, Italy
"Drama Queens", Centre Pompidou, Paris, France
"Trying to Remember What We Once Wanted to Forget", MUSAC, León, Spain

2008
"Too Late", Victoria Miro Gallery, London, UK
"Drama Queens", Old Vic Theatre, London, UK
"Home is the Place You Left", Trondheim Kunstmuseum, Trondheim, Norway
"Gedenkort für die im Nazionalsozialismus verfolgten Homosexuellen", Berlin, Germany
 "Side Effects", Galerie Emmanuel Perrotin, Paris, France.

2007
 "This is the first day of my life" Malmö Konsthall, Malmö, Sweden
"Ti sto pensando", Villa Manin, Centre for Contemporary Art, Passariano, Italy
"A Change Of Mind", Kunst am Bauzaun, Museion Bozen, Italy

2006
 "The Welfare Show", Serpentine Gallery, London/The Power Plant, Toronto, Ontario, Canada
 "Disgrace", Galerie Emmanuel Perrotin, Miami, USA
 "The Incidental Self", Taka Ishii Gallery, Tokyo, Japan
 "Would You Like Your Eggs A Little Different This Morning ?", Galleria Massimo De Carlo, Milan, Italy

2005
 "Prada Marfa", Art Production Fund/Ballroom Marfa, Marfa, Texas
 "The Brightness of Shady Lives", Galeria Helga de Alvear, Madrid, Spain
 "The Welfare Show", Bergen Kunsthall, Bergen, Norway / BAWAG Foundation, Vienna, Austria
 "Forgotten Baby", Wrong Gallery, New York, USA
 "End Station", Bohen Foundation, New York, USA
 "Linienstrasse 160, Neue Mitte", Klosterfelde, Berlin, Germany

2004
 "Intervention 37", Sprengel Museum, Hannover, Germany
 "Blocking The View", Tate Modern Gallery, London, UK
 "Moving Energies" - Aspekte der Sammlung Olbricht : Michael Elmgreen & Ingar Dragset, Museum Folkwang Essen, Essen, Germany

2003
 "Paris diaries", Galerie Emmanuel Perrotin, Paris, France
 "Phone Home", Tanya Bonakdar Gallery, New York, USA
 "Short Cut", Nicola Trussardi Foundation, Milan, Italy
 "Spaced out", Portikus, Frankfurt am Main, Germany
 "Please, Keep Quiet", Galleri Nicolai Wallner, Copenhagen, Denmark
 "Constructed Catastrophes, Fig. 2", CCA, Kitakyushu, Japan
 "Don't leave me this way", Galerie Emmanuel Perrotin, Paris, France

2002
 "How are You Today", Galleria Massimo de Carlo, Milan, Italy
 "Powerless Structures, Fig. 229", Galeria Helga de Alvear, Madrid Spain
 "Museum", Sala Montcada/Fundacio La Caixa, Barcelona, Spain
 "Suspended Space", Taka Ishii Gallery, Tokyo, Japan
 CGAC, Santiago de Compostela, Spain

2001
 "Taking Place", Kunsthalle Zürich, Zürich, Switzerland
 "Opening Soon", Tanya Bonakdar Gallery, New York, USA
 "A Room Defined by its Accessibility", Statens Museum for Kunst, Copenhagen, Denmark
 Galleri Nicolai Wallner, Copenhagen, Denmark
 "Linienstrasse 160", Klosterfelde, Berlin, Germany
 "Powerless Structures, Fig. 111", Portikus, Frankfurt, Germany

2000
 "Zwischen anderen Ereignissen", Galerie für Zeitgenössische Kunst Leipzig, Germany
 Roslyn Oxley9 Gallery, Sydney, Australia

1999
 Galleri Nicolai Wallner, Copenhagen, Denmark
 "Powerless Structures, Fig. 57-60", The Project, New York, USA

1998
 "Dug Down Gallery / Powerless Structures, Fig. 45", Galleri i8 & Reykjavik Art Museum, Reykjavik, Iceland

1997
 "Powerless Structures", Galleri Campbells Occasionally, Copenhagen, Denmark
 "Twelve Hours of White Paint/Powerless Structures, Fig. 15", Galleri Tommy Lund, Odense, Denmark

Group exhibitions (selected)

2022

 Politics in Art, MOCAK Museum of Contemporary Art in Krakow, Krakow, Poland 
 Every Moment Counts—AIDS and its Feelings, Henie Onstad Art Center, Høvikodden, Norway
 Art in the Elevator, Salzburg Museum der Moderne, Salzburg, Austria
 CASH on the Wall, Stiftung Kunstforum Berliner Volksbank, Berlin, Germnay
 MARMOR / MARBLE, Kunsten, Aalborg, Denmark
 Matrix of Gender, Bomuldsfabriken, Arendal, Norway
 HEM / HOME, Konstgalleriet Slottsholmen, Malmö, Sweden
 Why can’t we live together, Marburg Kunstverein, Marburg, Germany
 Blue Jeans - Myth and Marketing, Museumsquarier Osnabrück, Osnabrück, Germany
 And Now the Good News, Pera Museum, Istanbul, Türkei
 Exposition homosexuels et lesbiennes dans l’Europe nazie, Metz City Hall, Metz, France 
 Impossibles architectures, Musees des Beaux-Arts de Nancy, Nancy, France
 Heroic Bodies, Rudolph Tegners Museum, Denmark

2021

 Statements, Palazzo della Ragione, Bergamo, Italy
 Work It Out, Kunsten, Aalborg, Denmark 
 Psychopathia Sexualis, Overgaden, Copenhagen, Denmark
 Tempo, Museum Sinclair-Haus, Bad Heilbrunn, Germany 
 SkultpurOdense21, Hollufgård Skultpurparken, Odense, Denmark
 Wild/Schön, Kunsthalle Emden, Emden, Germany
 Grave Monuments, Kunsthal Aarhus, Aarhus, Denmark
 Monument for the Cemetery, Art Sonje Center, Seoul, Korea
 OASIS, Tallin Arhcitecture Museum, Tallin, Estonia
 Sobressalto: Coleção Norlina e José Lima, CAA, Portugal
 It’s Just a Phase, KUK, Trondheim, Norway

2020

 Mythologies - The Beginning and End of Civilisations, ARoS Triennal, ARoS Aarhus Art Museum, Aarhus, Denmark
 Wände | Walls, Kunstmuseum Stuttgart, Stuttgart Germany Studio Berlin, Berghain, Berlin, Germany
 Shapeshifters, Mälmo Konstmuseum, Mälmo, Sweden
 Animals in Art, ARKEN Museum for Moderne Kunst, Ishøj, Denmark
 I Put A Spell On You: On Artists Collaborations, SCAD, Savannah, USA
 “WALKING. Movements North of Bolzano” - The collection of Erling Kagge, Museion, Bolzano, Italy
 On the Frontline of Contemporary Art: From the Taguchi Art Collection, Shimonoeseki Art Museum, Yamaguchi, Japan
 WANTED!, Grand Palais, Paris, France 
 Szene Berlin, Schloss Derneburg, Hall Art Foundations, Holle, Germany
 OH! MY CITY, Paradise Art Space, Incheon, Korea
 Who Am I, Tang Contemporary Art, Beijing, China
 Friendship as a Way of Life, UNSW Galleries, Paddington, Australia
 A Greater Perspective, The606, Damen Arts Plaza, Chicago, USA

2019
"There I Belong. Hammershøi by Elmgreen & Dragset", Statens Museum fur Kunst, Copenhagen, Denmark
"Sculpture Milwaukee", Wisconsin, USA
"Art's Biggest Stage: Collecting the Venice Biennale 2007-2019", Clark Art Institute, Massachusetts, USA
"Art & Porn", ARoS Aarhus Kunstmuseum, Aarhus, Denmark
"Art & Porn", Kunsthal Charlottenborg, Copenhagen, Denmark
"Blickachsen 12", Bad Homburg, Germany
"Political Affairs - Language is not innocent" , Kunstverein in Hamburg, Hamburg, Germany
"A Cool Breeze", Galerie Rudolfinium, Prague, Czech Republic
 "Grand Hotel Abyss", steirischerherbst'19, Graz, Austria
"La Source", Villa Carmignac, Porquerolles, France
"Tainted Love", Villa Arson, Nice, France
"Schöne Sentimenten" , Museum Dhondt-Dhaenens, Sint-Martens-Latem, Belgium

2018
"Like Life: Sculpture, Color, and the Body", The Met Breuer, New York, USA
"Beyond Bliss", Bangkok Art Biennial, Bangkok, Thailand
"It's Never Too Late To Say Sorry", Aspen Museum of Art, Aspen, USA
"Soziale Fassaden", MMK Frankfurt am Main, Germany
"Minimalism: Space. Light. Object.", National Gallery of Singapore, Singapore
"Far From Home", ARoS Aarhus Kunstmuseum, Aarhus, Denmark
"No Place Like Home", Museu Coleção Berardo, Lisbon, Portugal
"Zeitspuren – The Power of Now", Kunsthaus Centre d’Art Pasquart, Biel/Bienne, Switzerland
"Talk Show Festival", La Panacée MoCo, Montpellier, France
"Ngorongoro II", Berlin, Germany

2017
"WAITING. Between Power and Possibility", Hamburger Kunsthalle, Hamburg, Germany
"No Place Like Home", Israel Museum, Jerusalem, Israel
"Cool, Calm and Collected", ARoS Aarhus Kunstmuseum, Aarhus, Denmark
"Commissions from Performa’s Archives", Whitechapel Gallery, London, UK
"Kuss. Von Rodin bis Bob Dylan", Bröhan Museum, Berlin, Germany
"OVER THE RAINBOW", Praz Delavallade, Los Angeles, California, USA
"Die Schönheit im Anderen/The Beauty of Difference", Schloss Lieberose, Lieberose, Germany
"Meet me in Heaven", Schloss Tüßling, Tüßling, Germany
"THE GARDEN: End of Time; Beginning of Time", ARoS Aarhus Kunstmuseum, Aarhus, Denmark
"The Beguiling Siren is Thy Crest", Museum of Modern Art, Warsaw, Poland
"Physical Mind Restless Hands", Galerie Micky Schubert, Berlin, Germany

2016
"The Others" , König Galerie, Berlin, Germany
"Animality", Marian Goodman Gallery, London, UK
"Protest", Victoria Miro Gallery, London, UK
"Moved", Taka Ishii Gallery, Tokyo, Japan
"No Man is an Island – The Satanic Verses", ARoS Aarhus Kunstmuseum, Aarhus, Denmark
"Staged! Spectacle and Role Playing in Contemporary Art", Kunsthalle München, Munich, Germany
"ta.bu", Maison Particulière Art Center, Brussels, Belgium

2015
"What We Call Love, From Surrealism to Now", performance piece, Irish Museum of Modern Art, Dublin. 
“Man in the Mirror”, Vanhaerents Art Collection, Brussels, Belgium
“Poor Art–Rich Legacy. Arte Povera and parallel practices 1968–2015”, Museum of Contemporary Art, Oslo, Norway
“Slip of the Tongue”, Punta Della Dogana, Venice, Italy
“Panorama”, High Line Art, New York, USA
“Infinite Experience”, Museo de Arte Latinoamericano de Buenos Aires (MALBA), Buenos Aires, Argentina
“Days push off into nights”, Spring Workshop, Hong Kong 
“All the World’s a Stage. Works from the Goetz Collection”, Fundación Banco Santander, Madrid, Spain
“No Hablaremos de Picasso”, Palacio Municipal Kiosko Alfonso, A Coruña, Spain
“more Konzeption Conception now”, Museum Morsbroich, Germany

2014
“Power Memory People – Memorials of Today”, KØS Museum of Art in Public Spaces, Køge, Denmark
“GOLD”, Bass Museum of Art, Miami, USA
“do it Moscow”, Independent Curators International, Garage Museum of Contemporary Art, Moscow, Russia
“Man in the Mirror”, Vanhaerents Art Collection, Brussels, Belgium
“Attention Economy”, Kunsthalle Wien, Vienna, Austria
“Do Not Disturb”, Gerhardsen Gerner Gallery, Oslo, Norway
“LOVE AIDS RIOT SEX II, Art Aids Activism from 1995 until today”, NBGK | Neue Gesellschaft für bildende Kunst, Berlin, Germany

2013
“Mom, am I barbarian?” , 13th Istanbul Biennial, Istanbul, Turkey
“auf Zeit”, Staatliche Kunsthalle Baden-Baden, Baden Baden, Germany

2012
"Nude Men", Leopold Museum, Vienna, Austria
"Common Ground", Public Art Fund, New York, USA
Liverpool Biennial, Liverpool, UK
“TRACK – A contemporary city conversation”, S.M.A.K., the Museum of Contemporary Art, Ghent, Belgium

2011
"Untitled" (12th Istanbul Biennial), Istanbul, Turkey
"You Are Not Alone", Joan Miró Foundation, Barcelona, Spain

2010
"Fourth Plinth Commission, Six new proposals", The Foyer, St. Martin-in-the-Fields, London, UK

Collections
Elmgreen & Dragset's work is in the permanent collection of several museums across the world including: 

 Mumok, "Museum of modern art, Ludwig Foundation, Vienna, Austria
 TBA21 Thyssen-Bornemisza Art Contemporary, Vienna, Austria
 Museum Hof van Busleyden, Mechelen, Belgium
 Vanhaerents Art Collection, Brussels, Belgium
 Museum Voorlinden, Wassenaar, Belgium
National Gallery of Canada, Ottawa, Canada
 Kunsthalle Praha, Prague, Czech Republic
 K11 Art Foundation, Hong Kong SAR, China
 Arken Museum of Modern Art, Ishøj, Denmark
 ARoS Aarhus Kunstmuseum, Aarhus, Denmark 
 Dokk1, Aarhus, Denmark
 Københavns Billedkunstudvalg, Copenhagen, Denmark
 KØS Museum of art in public spaces, Køge, Denmark
 KUNSTEN Museum of Modern Art Aalborg, Aalborg, Denmark 
 Louisiana Museum of Modern Art, Humlebaek, Denmark
 Museet for Samtidskunst, Roskilde, Denmark
 National Gallery of Denmark, Statens Museum for Kunst, Copenhagen, Denmark
 EMMA – Espoo Museum of Modern Art, Espoo, Finland
 Saastamoinen Foundation, Helsinki, Finland 
 Centre National des Arts Plastiques, Paris, France
 Fondation Emerige, Paris, France
 Fonds national d'art contemporain, Paris, France
 European Central Bank, Frankfurt am Main, Germany
 Galerie Orangerie-Reinz, Cologne, Germany
 Hamburger Bahnhof – Museum für Gegenwart, Berlin, Germany
 Kunstverein Springhornhof, Neuenkirchen, Germany
 Museum für Moderne Kunst, Frankfurt am Main, Germany
 KAT_Kunst am Turm, Bad Honnef-Rhöndorf, Germany 
 Kunsthalle Bremen, Bremen, Germany
 Kunstmuseen Krefeld, Krefeld, Germany
 Kunstverein Springhornhof, Neuenkirchen, Germany
 Museum für Moderne Kunst, Frankfurt am Main, Germany
 Museum Morsbroich, Leverkusen, Germany
 Pinakothek der Moderne, Munich, Germany
 Sammlung Boros, Berlin, Germany
 Sammlung Goetz, Munich, Germany
 Staatliche Kunstsammlungen Dresden, Dresden, Germany
 Städel Museum, Frankfurt am Main, Germany
 Stiftung Denkmal, Berlin, Germany
 Sunpride Foundation, Hong Kong
 Tel Aviv Museum of Art, Tel Aviv, Israel
 Israel Museum, Jerusalem, Israel
 Fondazione Prada, Milan, Italy
 Museion, Bolzano, Italy
 Fukutake Art Museum Foundation, Naoshima, Japan
 Aïshti Foundation, Beirut, Lebanon
 Colección Jumex, Fundación Jumex Arte Contemporáneo, Mexico City, Mexico
 Sculpture International Rotterdam (SIR), Rotterdam, Netherlands
 Astrup Fearnley Museum of Modern Art, Oslo, Norway
 Ekebergparken Sculpture Park, Oslo, Norway
 Kistefos-Museet, Jevnaker, Norway
 Equinor Art Programme, Stavanger, Norway
 Kistefos-Museet, Jevnaker, Norway
 Kode Art Museums, Bergen, Norway
 Kunstneriske Forstyrrelser, Tranøy, Norway
 Nasjonalmuseet, Oslo, Norway
 Park of the School of Agriculture, Ås, Norway
 Trondheim Kunstmuseum, Trondheim, Norway 
 Anyang Foundation for Culture & Arts, Anyang, South Korea 
 Leeum, Samsung Museum of Art, Seoul, South Korea
 Museo de Arte Contemporáneo Helga de Alvear, Cáceres, Spain 
 CGAC (Centro Galego de Arte Contemporánea), A Coruña, Spain 
 MUSAC (Museo de Arte Contemporáneo de Castilla y León), León, Spain
 Malmö Konstmuseum, Malmö, Sweden
 Moderna Museet, Stockholm, Sweden 
 Nicola Erni Collection, Zug, Switzerland
 Migros Museum für Gegenwartskunst, Zurich, Switzerland
 Soho House, London, UK
 Zabludowicz Collection, London, UK
 Art Production Fund / Ballroom Marfa, Marfa, USA
 Chazen Museum of Art, Madison, USA
 Columbus Museum of Art, Ohio, USA
 Denver Art Museum, Denver, USA
 The Donum Estate, Sonoma, USA
 Museum of Contemporary Art Chicago, Chicago, USA
 Nevada Museum of Art, Reno, USA

Commissions 

 Powerless Structures, Fig. 101, Mayor of London's Fourth Plinth Commission, Trafalgar Square, London, UK, 2012
 Han commissioned by city of Helsingør, the sculpture installed in the center of the harbor basin as a protagonist in Kulturhavn Kronborg, 2012
 Louis Vuitton New Bond Street Maison and Louis Vuitton Librairie, London, 2012
 Van Gogh’s Ear, Rockefeller Center, New York, 2016
 To Whom It May Concern, FIAC HORS LES MURS, Place Vendôme, Paris, 2018
 Zero, East Asiatic, Bangkok Art Biennale, 2018
 The Hive, Moynihan Train Hall, New York, USA, 2020
 Life Rings, Royal Djurgården, Stockholm, Sweden, 2021

Catalogues

Useless Bodies? (Milan: Nava Press, 2022). 
The Nervous System (New York: Pace, 2021). 
Elmgreen & Dragset: Sculptures (Berlin: Hatje Cantz Verlag, 2019). 
Elmgreen & Dragset (London: Phaidon, 2019). 
This Is How We Bite Our Tongue (London: Whitechapel Gallery, 2018). 
15th Istanbul Biennial: a good neighbour: Exhibition and Stories (Istanbul: Istanbul Foundation for Culture and the Arts, 2017). 
Die Zugezogenen (London: Koenig Books, 2017). 
The Others (Berlin: König Galerie / London: Koenig Books, 2017). 
The Well Fair, Elmgreen & Dragset (London: Koenig Books / Beijing: Ullens Center for Contemporary Art, 2016). 
Aéroport Mille Plateaux, Elmgreen & Dragset (Seoul: PLATEAU, Samsung Museum of Art, 2015). 
Biography, Elmgreen & Dragset (Ostfildern: Hatje Cantz, 2014). 
Biography (reader), Elmgreen & Dragset, Gunnar B. Kvaran and Kjersti Solbakken, eds. (Berlin: Archive Books, 2014). 
A Space Called Public, Elmgreen & Dragset, eds. (Köln: Verlag der Buchhandlung Walther König, 2013). 
Elmgreen & Dragset: Trilogy, Peter Weibel and Andreas F. Beitin, eds., exh. cat., ZKM Center for Art and Media, Karlsruhe (London: Thames & Hudson, 2011). 
Elmgreen & Dragset: Performances: 1995-2011, Anita Iannacchione, ed. (Köln: Verlag der Buchhandlung Walther König, 2011). 
Elmgreen & Dragset: This is the First Day of My Life, Anna Stüler, ed. (Ostfildern: Hatje Cantz Verlag, 2008). 
Home is the Place You Left, Elmgreen & Dragset, Trondheim Kunstmuseum (Köln: Verlag der Buchhandlung Walther König, 2008). 
Prada Marfa, Elmgreen & Dragset (Köln: Verlag der Buchhandlung Walther König, 2007). - no longer in print. 
The Welfare Show, Elmgreen & Dragset (Köln: Verlag der Buchhandlung Walther König, 2006). - no longer in print. 
Taking Place, Beatrix Ruf, ed., exh. cat. Kunsthalle Zürich (Ostfildern: Hatje Cantz Verlag, 2002). - no longer in print. 
Zwischen anderen Ereignissen, exh. cat. (Leipzig: Galerie für Zeitgenössische Kunst, 2000). - no longer in print.
Powerless Structures exh. cat. (1998). - no longer in print.

Gallery

References

Further reading
 (Podcast)
Video interview with Elmgreen and Dragset, on the occasion of their 2011 exhibition 'The One & The Many' in Rotterdam (NL)

External links

 

1961 births
Living people
Art duos
Artists from Copenhagen
Danish contemporary artists
Gay artists
Danish LGBT artists
Norwegian LGBT artists
Norwegian contemporary artists
Recipients of the Eckersberg Medal